Edward of Norfolk or Edward of Brotherton (c.1323 – before 9 August 1334), was the only son of Thomas of Brotherton, and a grandson of King Edward I of England.

Born about 1323, Edward was the only son of Thomas of Brotherton, eldest son of King Edward I by his second marriage to Margaret of France (1279?–1318), the daughter of King Philippe III of France (d.1285). His mother was Alice de Hales (d. in or before 1330), daughter of Sir Roger de Hales of Hales Hall in Loddon in Roughton, Norfolk, by his wife Alice Skogan. He had two sisters:

Margaret, Duchess of Norfolk  (d. 24 March 1399), who married firstly John Segrave, 4th Baron Segrave, by whom she had two sons and two daughters, and secondly Sir Walter Manny.
Alice of Norfolk (d. 30 January 1352), who married, before 29 August 1338, Sir Edward Montagu (d. 14 July 1361), by whom she had a son and two daughters.

Shortly after 29 May 1328, at Hereford, Edward of Norfolk married Beatrice Mortimer, daughter of Roger Mortimer, 1st Earl of March, by Joan de Geneville (d.1356), daughter and coheiress of Sir Peter de Geneville. The occasion was a double wedding at which the bride's sister, Agnes Mortimer, married Laurence Hastings, later 1st Earl of Pembroke. The celebrations were accompanied by a magnificent tournament, and were attended by Edward III and his mother, Isabella of France, who was by then the mistress of the bride's father, Roger Mortimer. There was no issue of the marriage, and two years after the ceremony Roger de Mortimer was hanged at Tyburn as a common criminal.

Edward of Norfolk died before 9 August 1334, predeceasing his father.

His widow married, before 13 September 1337, Sir Thomas de Brewes (d. 9 or 16 June 1361), son and heir of Sir Peter de Brewes of Tetbury, Gloucestershire, and his wife Agnes de Clifford, by whom she had three sons and three daughters.

After the death of Thomas of Brotherton on 4 August 1338, Edward of Norfolk's elder sister, Margaret, succeeded to the earldom of Norfolk.

Ancestry

Notes

References
 

 

 

1320s births
1330s deaths
House of Plantagenet
14th-century English people